"A Vida É Bela (Lalaiá)" (Portuguese for "Life Is Beautiful [Lalaiá]") is a single by the Brazilian band Metrô. It was released digitally through music streaming services on October 14, 2016, and is the second single made available for an intended fourth studio album, after "Dando Voltas no Mundo", released the year before.

The song's lyrics were written by Rubinho Jacobina, brother of the late musician Nélson Jacobina (who collaborated with Metrô in 2002, on their album Déjà-Vu), and the music was composed by the band's vocalist, Virginie Boutaud.

Track listing
 "A Vida É Bela (Lalaiá)" – 3:25

Personnel
 Virginie Boutaud – vocals
 Daniel "Dany" Roland – drums, production
 Xavier Leblanc – bass guitar
 Yann Laouenan – keyboards
 Alec Haiat – guitar
 Bruno LT – cover art, mixing, production

References

2016 singles
2016 songs